is a town located in Miyagi Prefecture, Japan. ,  the town had an estimated population of 28,436, and a population density of 130 persons per km² in 12,016 households.

Geography
Taiwa is located in central Miyagi Prefecture, bordered to the south by the metropolis of Sendai. Much of the area of the town is forested.

Neighboring municipalities
Miyagi Prefecture
Sendai
Tomiya
Ōsaki
Ōsato
Shikama
Rifu

Climate
The town has a climate characterized by cool summers and long cold winters (Köppen climate classification Cfa).  The average annual temperature in Taiwa is 11.6 °C. The average annual rainfall is 1292 mm with September as the wettest month. The temperatures are highest on average in August, at around 24.5 °C, and lowest in January, at around -0.3 °C.

Demographics
Per Japanese census data, the population of Taiwa has grown over the past 50 years.

History
The area of present-day Taiwa was part of ancient Mutsu Province, and has been settled since at least the Jōmon period by the Emishi people. Numerous kofun were built in the area during the Kofun period. During later portion of the Heian period, the area was ruled by the Northern Fujiwara. During the Sengoku period, the area was contested by various samurai clans before the area came under the control of the Date clan of Sendai Domain during the Edo period, under the Tokugawa shogunate. Yoshioka-juku developed as a major post station on the Ōshū Kaidō during this time. Following the Meiji restoration, the town of Yoshioka was established with the creation of the modern municipalities system.

The town of Taiwa was created on April 20, 1955, as a result of a merger between the town of Yoshioka, and the villages of Miyatoko, Yoshida, Tsurusu, and Ochiai, all within Kurokawa District.

Government
Taiwa has a mayor-council form of government with a directly elected mayor and a unicameral town council of 18 members. Taiwa, together with the rest of Kurokawa District and the city of Tomiya collectively contributes two seats to the Miyagi Prefectural legislature. In terms of national politics, the town is part of Miyagi 5th district of the lower house of the Diet of Japan.

Economy
Taiwa contains a number of industrial parks, and has a strong manufacturing base.

Education
Miyagi University
Taiwa has six public elementary schools and two public high schools operated by the town government, and one public high school operated by the Miyagi Prefectural Board of Education.

Transportation

Railway
Taiwa does not have any passenger railway service.

Highway
 - Taiwa IC

Local attractions
Miyatoko Dam
Minamikawa Dam
Yoshioka Hachiman Jinja
Nanatsumori

References

External links

Official Website 

 
Towns in Miyagi Prefecture